The women's 3000 metres steeplechase at the 2015 World Championships in Athletics was held at the Beijing National Stadium on 24 and 26 August.

Summary
The reigning champion from 2013 Milcah Chemos Cheywa was absent from the competition due to a back injury.

This championship race had a preview of sorts at the 2015 Herculis meet in Monaco where most of the finalists raced to a different order.  That race was won by Habiba Ghribi in the world leading time.  This final was going to be slower and tactical, everybody was watching each other.  A lap into the race, Lalita Babar broke away, building up a 10 to 15 meter gap on the pack.  She was treated as a breakaway in a bicycle racing, but the peloton didn't give chase.  With 2 laps to go, the pack led by Emma Coburn swallowed up the lead and went past.  For the next lap, the pack was content to let Coburn lead, Ghribi coming up to her shoulder and the rest going sometimes five abreast over the barriers.  At the bell, Ghribi took the lead, Hyvin Kiyeng Jepkemoi and Coburn battling down the backstretch.  Going into the final water jump Jepkemoi finally passed Coburn, with Gesa Felicitas Krause and Sofia Assefa forming a tight pack of five to sprint for the medals.  As Krause pressed Ghribi from the inside, Jepkemoi had to swing wide out to lane two to find some running room.  Krause took the lead over the final barrier as Ghribi stuttered.  Ghribi was stronger to take the lead back from Krause but Jepkemoi ran past both of them on the outside and on to victory.

Records
Prior to the competition, the records were as follows:

Qualification standards

Schedule

Results

Heats
Qualification: First 3 in each heat (Q) and the next 6 fastest (q) advanced to the final.

Final
The final was held at 21:00.

References

3000 metres steeplechase
Steeplechase at the World Athletics Championships
2015 in women's athletics